The United States Army Combat Capabilities Development Command Armaments Center (CCDCAC), or Armaments Center, headquartered at Picatinny Arsenal in New Jersey, is the US Army's primary research and development arm for armaments and munitions. Besides its Picatinny headquarters, the Armaments Center has three other research facilities, including Benét Laboratories. The Armaments Center works to develop more advanced weapons using technologies such as microwaves, lasers and nanotechnology. The Armaments Center was established in February 2019, when it was aligned with the United States Army Futures Command along with its senior organization, the United States Army Combat Capabilities Development Command. Armaments Center was called the U.S. Army Armament Research Development and Engineering Center (ARDEC).

The Armaments Center is the R&D center for armaments used by the U.S. Army, United States Special Operations Command (SOCOM), and other U.S. military organizations. It is one of the specialized research, development, and engineering centers within the U.S. Army Futures Command. Armaments Center's purpose is to provide battlefield supremacy for U.S. troops through “overmatch capabilities.” Over the past 10 years, Armaments Center has developed and released more than 20 products that have provided U.S. troops with “world’s best” capabilities, compared with products from foreign military and other U.S. defense organizations.

The Armaments Center is the lead research, development and engineering of systems solutions to arm those who defend the nation against all current and future threats, both at home and abroad. Armaments Center is broken into a number of directorates such as "Weapons Systems and Technology Directorate" and "Munitions Systems and Technology Directorate".

History
The Armaments Center traces its history to the creation of the U.S. Army Armament Research and Development Center (ARRADCOM) in 1977. Their mission was to create new and improve old weapons and munitions. Among their early work was modelling of the M1 Abrams tank. Under the ARRADCOM command were the R&D centers at Picatinny Arsenal, Edgewood Arsenal, the Ballistic Research Lab and Watervliet Arsenal.

In 1983, ARRADCOM's original mission was handed to the U.S. Army Armament, Munitions and Chemical Command (AMCCOM) at Rock Island Arsenal. However, the original weapons and munitions R&D mission remained at Picatinny after being renamed the U.S. Army Armament Research and Development Center (ARDC). In 1986, a further reorganization of all of the Army's R&D centers caused ARDC to become ARDEC. This name was retained when the group was transferred again to the Tank-automotive and Armament Command (TACOM) in 1994, and again to the Research, Development and Engineering Command (RDECOM) in 2003.

Among the many systems the Armaments Center has worked on over its history are the Patriot missile, fire control systems and ammunition for the M2 Bradley, M1 Abrams, and M712 Copperhead anti-tank artillery missile. More recently, ARDEC has worked on bunker defeat munitions, XM107 sniper rifle, M919 round for the M242 Bushmaster, M830 high-explosive anti-tank (HEAT) munition, M211 and M212 countermeasure flares, M4 carbine, and many other systems.

Efforts to diversify the Armaments Center revenue stream have led to a growth in non-Army revenue from about $60 million in FY 2001 to $140 million in FY07. The overall revenue has increased from approximately $600 million in FY 2001 to around $1.2 billion in FY 2007. Designated as the benchmark for the Army in technology transfer, ARDEC has had approximately 75 percent of its technology projects transition from research into customer funded development since FY 2005.

The Armaments Center has received awards and recognition based on customer satisfaction and perceived value including Value Engineering Accomplishments of Merit. Over the past five years, The Armaments Center has won 13 of the Army’s “10 Greatest Inventions of the Year” awards.

In 2003, the various Army RD&E centers were put under the Research, Development and Engineering Command located in Aberdeen Proving Ground, Maryland. Recently in 2019, the United States Army Armament Research, Development and Engineering Center came under the new Army Future's Command and became known as the Combat Capabilities Development Command Armaments Center. .

See also
Nanoweapons

References

 CCDC Armaments Center
Military simulation
Morris County, New Jersey
1977 establishments in New Jersey